Poyatos is a municipality located in the province of Cuenca, Castile-La Mancha, Spain. According to the 2010 census (INE), the municipality had a population of 93 inhabitants.

References

Municipalities in the Province of Cuenca